A manica ("sleeve") or cheires by the Greeks was a type of iron or bronze arm guard, with curved and overlapping metal segments or plates, fastened to leather straps, worn by Roman gladiators called crupellarii, and later optionally by soldiers.

History and usage

As early as Achaemenid times, there were references to "cheires" (χειρίς) which consisted of hoops of metal that would be worn on the rein arm of a cavalryman. Hooped armour became extremely popular to use on both arms and legs in the Saka, Parthian, and Kushan kingdoms. They can be seen at Khalchayan and on many pieces of Parthian artwork.

Roman troops fought crupellarii in the revolt of Florus and Sacrovir of AD 21. It is unclear how widely the manica was used in Trajan's Dacian Wars. Manicae (along with metal greaves) are attested as a supplement to metal body armor on several reliefs depicting that campaign, including the Tropaeum Traiani at Adamclisi and Trajan's Column. 

Trajan's column in Rome seems to suggest that the lorica segmentata and the manicae were only issued to Roman-born legionaries and not to auxiliaries. However, the Tropaeum Traiani, which is considered a better guide to the reality of field equipment, portrays Roman legionaries and heavy infantry auxiliaries equipped in the same fashion—both wearing scale body armour with manica arm guards.

Finds identified as manicae have come from Carlisle, Trimontium (Newstead), Carnuntum, Richborough, Coria (Corbridge), Eining (Abusina) on the Danube frontier, Leon, and Ulpia Traiana Sarmizegetusa. A very well preserved manica was found in 2010–11 in a soldier's barracks at the Roman castle of Steincheshof on the Rhine frontier. It dated from the last third of the first century to the first third of the second century. These suggest that manicae were used by the Roman military during the 1st century AD, independent from the Dacian wars. During those wars the Manica was used to protect soldiers from falxes.

The sculpture at Alba Julia provides evidence of the manica in use in the 2nd and 3rd centuries AD by the military. Ammianus describes Roman cavalry (probably cataphracts) on parade in 350 AD  as "Laminarum circuli tenues apti corporis flexibus ambiebant per omnia membra diducti." ("Thin circles of iron plates, fitted to the curves of their bodies, completely covered their limbs"). Around 400 AD, manicae are represented on the Column of Arcadius and in the Notitia Dignitatum.

Forging

M. C. Bishop lists likely components as one shoulder plate, about 35 metal (ferrous or copper alloy) strips, 90-120 leathering rivets, 3 or 4 internal leathers, and one padded lining. The lining may have been a separate component, in order to avoid it being torn by the articulated metal plates. The metal strips were about 25 to 30 mm wide and 0.35 to 0.5 mm in thickness; they were longer at the top of the arm. Each strip had holes at its lower edge, through which flat-headed copper alloy rivets passed from the inside to hold the leather straps in place. It also had a hole punched at each end, which did not have a rivet and presumably served as an attachment point for an organic fastening. The lower few plates were in some cases riveted together, rather than articulated on leather. One depiction appears to show a manica terminating in a hand shape. 

The usual arm position depicted for Roman swordsmen is with the upper arm vertical and close to the torso, the forearm extended horizontally with the thumb uppermost. The plates were probably not long enough to cover the whole circumference of the arm, but would have extended from the upper arm down to the thumb, leaving an unprotected area at the back. The plates overlapped upwards, directing any blow to the inside of the elbow which had a particularly dense coverage of multiple plates.

See also 
 Laminar armour
 Lorica plumata
 Lorica squamata

References

Inline citations

General references
 Tacitus, Annales, III 43
 Ammianus 
 Curle, James. A Roman Frontier Post and its People.
 Shadrake, Susanna. The World of the Gladiator.

External links
 Roman manica from Newstead
 "Manica lamminata". Michael Simkins. Arma vol. 2, no. 2, December 1990, pages 23–26. ISSN 0960-9172. 
 Lorica Segmentata—M. C. Bishop's site

Gladiatorial combat
Ancient Roman legionary equipment
Roman armour